Islands is the 11th album by Mike Oldfield, released on 28 September 1987 by Virgin in the UK. Guest singers on the album are Bonnie Tyler, Kevin Ayers, Anita Hegerland, Max Bacon, and Jim Price. A different track list and cover was used for the American edition.

Music videos, producers and singers 
Islands was also released as a full-length VHS video album. For each track a video was made and released, often mixing state of the art (for the time) computer-generated images with real life images. This was released as part of The Wind Chimes video.

The album boasts the largest number of co-producers out of all of Oldfield's work; production was handled by Michael Cretu (later of Enigma fame), Geoffrey Downes, Tom Newman, Simon Phillips, Alan Shacklock, and Oldfield himself. Singers on the album are Bonnie Tyler, Kevin Ayers, Anita Hegerland, Max Bacon, and Jim Price.

Album artwork 
The UK front cover artwork was of a tropical island, and hidden in the surrounding sea is a large number of hand shapes. The hand images are based on a still frame from the longform video released at the same time as the album; a couple of scenes in the video, which was mainly filmed in Bali, feature a group of natives performing a ritualistic dance which involves hand-waving movements. The American cover is completely different; it displays two cube shapes. The photography on the back of the US version was by Jerry Uelsmann.

Charts

Weekly charts

Year-end charts 

The major single in Europe was the title track, "Islands", which was sung by Bonnie Tyler. In the United States, "Magic Touch" was a top 10 hit on the Billboard Hot Mainstream Rock Tracks charts in early 1988.

Certifications

Track listing 
All tracks composed by Mike Oldfield.

1987 UK release

Side one
 "The Wind Chimes (Part One and Part Two)" – 21:49

Side two
 "Islands" – 4:19
 "Flying Start" – 3:36
 "North Point" – 3:33
 "Magic Touch" (New Jim Price Vocal) – 4:14
 "The Time Has Come" – 3:51
 "When the Night's on Fire" (Bonus track on CD version) – 6:41

Original 1988 US release

Side one
 "The Wind Chimes (Part one)" – 2:33
 "The Wind Chimes (Part two)" – 19:14

Side two
 "Magic Touch" (Original Max Bacon vocal) – 4:14
 "The Time Has Come" – 3:51
 "North Point" – 3:31
 "Flying Start" – 3:36
 "Islands" – 4:19

Personnel 
 Mike Oldfield - guitars, Danelectro Electric sitar guitar on Flying Start, bass, keyboards, percussion, vocals 
 Micky Moody - electric guitars 
 Rick Fenn - acoustic and electric guitars
 Phil Spalding - bass
 Mickey Simmonds - keyboards
 Anita Hegerland – vocals (on "The Wind Chimes", "North Point", "The Time Has Come", "When the Night's on Fire")
 Bonnie Tyler – vocals (on "Islands")
 Kevin Ayers – vocals (on "Flying Start")
 Max Bacon – vocals (on "Magic Touch" [1988 US Issue]; backing vocals on "Islands")
 Jim Price – vocals (on "Magic Touch" [1987 UK Issue])
 Mervyn Spence - (backing vocals on "Magic Touch")
 Raf Ravenscroft – saxophone (on "Islands")
 Andy Mackay - saxophone, oboe 
 Björn J:son Lindh – flute (on "The Wind Chimes")
 Simon Phillips – drums (on "The Wind Chimes")
 Pierre Moerlen - drums, vibes
 Tony Beard - drums
 Benoit Moerlen - vibes, percussion

Singles 
Four singles were released from the album, two of which were released in 1987, "Islands" (as Mike & Bonnie) and "The Time Has Come", and two in 1988, "Flying Start" and "Magic Touch".

"Flying Start" 

"Flying Start" was released as the third single from Islands on 1 February 1988. It features Kevin Ayers on vocals who had collaborated with Oldfield in his band, the Whole World, even prior to Oldfield's debut album, Tubular Bells. Oldfield used a Danelectro Coral sitar on this song, an instrument that does not feature on many of Oldfield's releases. The music video features various computer generated elements.

Unusually for an Oldfield 12-inch at that time, the extended duration was achieved simply by a short introductory instrumental that bears no musical relation to the rest of the song and is separated from it by a short pause; the song itself is identical to the album and 7-inch versions. Prior to this, Oldfield had usually extended his songs for their 12-inch versions by incorporating an extra verse and/or instrumental section within the main body of the track. The 12-inch version has since appeared on the 2006 compilation album, The Platinum Collection.

A different version of the song produced by Colin Fairley was also released on Kevin Ayers' own album Falling Up in February 1988.

Track listing 
 7-inch
 "Flying Start" – 3:37
 "The Wind Chimes" (Excerpt from part 2) – 3:58

 12 inch
 "Flying Start" (Extended version) – 4:50
 "The Wind Chimes" (Excerpt from part 2) – 3:58

References 

Sources

External links 
 Mike Oldfield Discography – Islands at Tubular.net
 Islands lyrics at Tubular.net

1987 albums
Mike Oldfield albums
Virgin Records albums
Albums produced by Tom Newman (musician)
Albums produced by Simon Phillips (drummer)
Albums produced by Michael Cretu
Albums produced by Alan Shacklock